Rajageetham (English: King of Music) is a Tamil reality show that premiered on 5 January 2014. Airs Sunday at 11:00am on Raj TV. In this program 4 participants take part, 2 males and 2 females. They sing a song and the audience judge their talent.

Judges
 Singer Ganga
 Singer Dhilip
 Music Director Dharan

External links
 Raj TV Official Site 
  Raj TV on YouTube
 Raj Television Network

Raj TV television series
2014 Tamil-language television series debuts
Tamil-language television shows